Josh Woods (born July 1, 1996) is an American football linebacker for the Detroit Lions of the National Football League (NFL). He played college football at Maryland.

Early life and high school
Woods was born and grew up in Baltimore, Maryland and attended the McDonogh School. He played both cornerback and wide receiver for the Eagles and was named first-team All-Metro by the Baltimore Sun and first-team All-State as a senior after making 35 tackles with four interceptions on defense catching 35 passes for 800 yards and 10 touchdowns on offense as McDonogh went 11-0 and won its first MIAA state championship.  All 4 years in high school, Josh was an academic all american.  He maintained a GPA of 4.267 upon graduating high school. Rated a three-star recruit, Woods committed to play college football at the University of Maryland over offers from Virginia and Delaware.

College career
Woods played four seasons for the Maryland Terrapins as a defensive back. He was used primarily on special teams during his freshman and sophomore seasons, playing in 14 total games and making two tackles. Woods became a key member of the Terrapins secondary as a junior, playing in ten games with five starts while making 41 tackles (one for loss) and breaking up two passes. As a senior, Woods made 62 tackles (4.5 for loss) with four passes broken up and two interceptions despite missing two games due to injury.

Professional career

Chicago Bears
Woods was signed by the Chicago Bears on June 7, 2018 after participating in a veteran mini-camp on a tryout basis. He was cut by the team at the end of training camp but was re-signed to the team's practice squad on September 2, 2018. He spent the entire 2018 season on the practice squad as he continued to transition to linebacker, adding 30 pounds in the process. After a strong showing in preseason, Woods made the Bears 53-man roster going into the 2019 season.

Woods made his NFL debut on September 29, 2019, against the Minnesota Vikings, playing 15 snaps on special teams. Woods played in nine games in 2019 and made five total tackles.

Woods signed a contract extension with the Bears on March 3, 2021. He was waived on September 6, 2021 and re-signed to the practice squad.

Detroit Lions
On September 23, 2021, Woods was signed by the Detroit Lions off the Bears practice squad. He was placed on injured reserve on December 28.

On February 22, 2022, Woods signed a one-year contract extension with the Lions.

References

External links
Chicago Bears bio
Maryland Terrapins bio

1996 births
Living people
Players of American football from Baltimore
American football linebackers
Chicago Bears players
Detroit Lions players
Maryland Terrapins football players